Caproidae, or boarfishes, are a small family  of marine fishes comprising two genera and 12 species. They were formerly placed in the order Zeiformes with the dories, but are now placed with the Perciformes since they have many perciform characteristics, for instance in the caudal skeleton. Boarfishes are native to the Indian, Atlantic, and Pacific Oceans, where they are mainly found at depths below .

Boarfishes have deep and thin bodies. Their coloration is red, pink, and silvery.

The earliest identified caproid fossils date to the middle Eocene epoch of the early Tertiary period, or roughly 48.6 to 40 million years ago.

See also
 Some fish of the family Pentacerotidae (order Perciformes) are also called boarfish.

References

 
Extant Eocene first appearances
Taxa named by Charles Lucien Bonaparte